The McCartney Legacy is a biographical book series about the post-Beatles musical career of Paul McCartney, written by music journalist Allan Kozinn and researcher Adrian Sinclair. Volume 1 of the series, covering the years 1969–1973, was released on 13 December 2022. A second volume, covering 1974–1980, is planned for the end of 2024. The project was influenced and inspired by the work of Beatles historian Mark Lewisohn, author of the The Beatles: All These Years series. McCartney did not participate in the project but did not discourage others from giving interviews, such as former Wings drummer Denny Seiwell.

Volume 1 was received favorably in The New York Times as a "well-planned encore" to McCartney's 2021 semi-autobiographical work, The Lyrics: 1956 to the Present. Music scholar Kenneth Womack praised it as "a triumph. Masterful in scope and full of rich detail." In The Times, Daniel Finkelstein gave a negative review, complaining that it was too long and was a substandard "imitator" of Lewisohn's work. The Irish Times gave a mixed review, offering that the book was "often compelling", but also "so exhaustive it’s almost like swimming through treacle to get to something that little bit more interesting".

References

2022 non-fiction books
Books about the Beatles
English non-fiction books
Multi-volume biographies